Austinville is an unincorporated community and census-designated place (CDP) on the New River in southern Wythe County, Virginia, United States. It was first listed as a CDP in the 2020 census with a population of 119. New River Trail State Park runs through Austinville, and Shot Tower Historical State Park is located nearby. The town is the birthplace of Stephen F. Austin, for whose family it is named.

The ZIP code (mail delivery region) for Austinville extends south into neighboring Carroll County.

Austinville is built on the location of Lead Mines, the seat of the former Fincastle County.

References

Census-designated places in Wythe County, Virginia
Census-designated places in Virginia